Canut is a surname of Catalan origin. It is of religious lineage. Canut is one of the oldest surnames of Catalonia. The name was taken to pay tribute to King Canute IV of Denmark, a devout Catholic king. It can likewise be found around the immediate areas surrounding Catalonia.

References

Apellidos catalanes: heráldica de Catalunya by: Cuartas, Augusto

Published: Madrid : Paraninfo, 1987.

External links
 Heraldica.es 
  Surnames from Catalonia

Catalan-language surnames